Christ Driving the Money Changers from the Temple is a 1571 Christian art painting by El Greco, now in the Minneapolis Institute of Art. It depicts the Cleansing of the Temple, an event in the Life of Christ.

There exist three other copies of the painting and also a faithful reproduction in the National Gallery in London, which has recently been considered as authentic by scholars in the field of visual arts. Two versions and that other on loan from Madrid are titled Purification of the Temple. The one at the National Gallery in Washington is called Christ Cleansing the Temple.

References

Paintings by El Greco
1570s paintings
Paintings depicting the Passion of Jesus
Paintings in Minnesota
Birds in art
Paintings of children